The 1964 KFK competitions in Ukraine were part of the 1964 Soviet KFK competitions that were conducted in the Soviet Union. It was first season of the KFK competitions in Ukraine. Each region of Ukraine delegated one team to the competition.

The winner of the competition FC Enerhiya Nova Kakhovka was not promoted to the 1965 Ukrainian Class B (Soviet Class B, III tier). Instead of them, to the Class B were promoted the 2nd place runner-up Shakhtar Krasnyi Luch.

Teams
In total 26 participants took place in this season competition. Many former participants (10) of the 1959 Football Championship of the Ukrainian SSR joined this season competition. Beside them several (16) new teams made their debut this season.

 Debut: Strila Zaporizhia, Kolhosp Ukrayina Yarke Pole, Shakhtar Krasnyi Luch, Suputnyk Poltava, Elektron Romny, Start Chuhuiv, Burevisnyk Vinnytsia, Podillia Kamianets-Podilskyi, Torpedo Odesa, Kolhospnyk Kitsman, Prohres Berdychiv, Voskhod Kyiv, Tekstylnyk Rivno, LVVPU, Budivelnyk Khust, Lokomotyv Kovel

 Renamed: Avanhard Mykolaiv → Torpedo Mykolaiv, Avanhard Druzhkivka → Mashynobudivnyk Druzhkivka, KremHESbud → Dnipro KremHES
 Avanhard Pryluky competed as Avanhard Ladan

Location of teams

Group stage

Group 1

Group 2

Group 3

Group 4

Group 5

Group 6

Final
Final stage was taking place on 29 October – 5 November 1964 in cities of Kakhovka and Nova Kakhovka.

Results

Promotion
Only one team was promoted to the 1965 Ukrainian Class B.
 Shakhtar Krasnyi Luch

Beside Shakhtar to the Class B were promoted following teams that did not participate in the KFK competitions:
 Avtomobilist Odesa
 Shakhtar Torez

See also
 1964 Ukrainian Class B
 1964 Football Cup of Ukrainian SSR among KFK
 1959 Football Championship of the Ukrainian SSR

References

Ukrainian Football Amateur League seasons
KFK